Stephen Thayer Olney (February 15, 1812 – July 27, 1878) was an American manufacturer and botanist with expertise in the genus Carex.

The monotypic plant genus Olneya (Olneya tesota, desert ironwood) was named in his honor by his friend and fellow botanist Asa Gray.

References

Botanists active in North America
19th-century American botanists
1812 births
1878 deaths